Titanium diselenide (TiSe2) also known as titanium(IV) selenide, is an inorganic compound of titanium and selenium. In this material selenium is viewed as selenide (Se2−) which requires that titanium exists as Ti4+. Titanium diselenide is a member of metal dichalcogenides, compounds that consist of a metal and an element of the chalcogen column within the periodic table. Many exhibit properties of potential value in battery technology, such as intercalation and electrical conductivity, although most applications focus on the less toxic and lighter disulfides, e.g. TiS2.

Structure
Within the titanium-selenium system, many stoichiometries have been identified. Titanium diselenide crystallizes with the CdI2 -type structure, in which the octahedral holes between alternating hexagonal closely packed layer of Se2− layers (that is half of the total number of octahedral holes) are occupied by Ti4+ centers. The CdI2 structure is often referred to as a layer structure as the repeating layers of atoms perpendicular to the close packed layer form the sequence Se-Ti-Se…Se-Ti-Se…Se-Ti-Se with weak van der Waals interactions between the selenium atoms in adjacent layers. The structure has (6,3)-coordination, being octahedral for the cation and trigonal pyramidal for the anions. The structure type is found commonly for many transition metal halides as well. This layered structure is known to undergo intercalation by alkali metals (M), resulting in the formation of MxTiSe2 (x ≤ 1), thereby expanding the weak van der Waals gaps between the 2D layered sheets.

Synthesis
A mixture of titanium and selenium are heated under argon atmosphere to produce crude samples.  The crude product is typically purified by chemical vapor transport using iodine as the transport agent.

Ti  +  2 Se   →   TiSe2

References

Selenides
Titanium(IV) compounds
Transition metal dichalcogenides